Marjorie Sherlock (1897-1973) was a British painter and etcher. Three books of her etchings were published between 1925 and 1932. Her painting Liverpool Street Station, now in the Government Art Collection, was first shown at the Royal Academy in 1917 and in 1987 was at 10 Downing Street when Margaret Thatcher was Prime Minister of the United Kingdom.

She studied at the Westminster Technical Institute, a pupil of Walter Sickert and Harold Gilman; at the Slade School of Fine Art; and the Royal College of Art. In Paris, she studied and worked with André Dunoyer de Segonzac and André Lhote. She was influenced by the Camden Town Group. Her works were exhibited at the Royal Academy for 50 years. She was a friend and travelling companion of Orovida Pissarro, the daughter of Lucien Pissarro.

Personal life
Alice Marjorie Sherlock was born to Alice Mary (née Platts) Sherlock and civil engineer Henry Alexander George Sherlock at Fir Tree Cottage, George Lane, Wanstead, Essex. In 1918 she married her first cousin, Wilfrid Kenyon Tufnell Barrett, who was born in 1897. They later divorced. Barrett, an Army Major, died in 1975. She was described as "a woman of distinct and forceful character."

Sherlock liked to travel and visited the United States during the depression. In the 1940s she moved to Axminster, near Ottery St Mary in a "rambling" and "isolated" house. Orovida Pissarro, the daughter of Lucien Pissarro, lived near her and financed trips for the two of them. Sherlock grew her own vegetables and made her own clothes to supplement her limited income. She died of a heart attack on 2 April 1973 at her house on Angela Court in Tipton St John, Devon.

Education
During World War I, Sherlock studied under Walter Sickert and Harold Gilman at the Westminster Technical Institute. In 1917 Liverpool Street Station, an oil painting, was exhibited at the Royal Academy. Gilman died in 1919, after only a short time as a teacher at Westminster, but by then he had inspired a loyal group of followers, including Mary Godwin, Ruth Doggett, and Sherlock, who carried on with his approach into the 1920s and 1930s.

Sherlock also studied at the Slade School of Fine Art and studied etching beginning in 1926 at the Royal College of Art. She worked in Paris with Dunoyer de Segonzac and André Lhote.

Artist
Sherlock made oil paintings and copper etchings, in pen and ink, and in pencil. She created detailed, complex works, like the etching Waterloo Station. Her Egyptian, German and Indian etchings were published in 1925, 1929 and 1932, respectively. She was influenced by the Camden Town Group.

For more than 50 years her works were exhibited at the Royal Academy of Arts. There were also exhibited in other group exhibitions at the Carnegie Institute, the International Society of Sculptors, Painters, and Gravers, the Royal Society of British Artists, Chicago Society of Etchers, the New English Art Club, and the Society of Graphic Art.

Her painting Liverpool Street, made in 1917, was in the 10 Downing Street collection in 1987, when Margaret Thatcher was Prime Minister of the United Kingdom.

Works
A few of her works are:
 Liverpool Street Station, 1917, Government Art Collection
 Liverpool Street Station in the Twenties, 1920s, National Railway Museum
 Railway Lines in the Snow, 1921, Bristol Museum and Art Gallery
 Landscape with Railway, date unknown, Government Art Collection
 Waterloo Station, etching, date unknown.

Notes

References

Further reading
 P. & D. Colnaghi & Co. British printmakers, 1850-1940: exhibition 21 May to 17 June 1975. P & D Colnaghi & Co. Ltd.; 1975. p. 22.
 Country Life. Country Life, Limited; 1986. p. 116–119.
 Kenneth M. Guichard. British etchers, 1850-1940. George Pryor; 1977. p. 58.
 Marcus Bourne Huish; David Croal Thomson; Albert Charles Robinson Carter. The Year's Art. Macmillan and Company; 1942. p. 49.
 Raymond Lister. With my own wings: the memoirs of Raymond Lister. Oleander Press; 31 December 1994. . p. 76, 97.
 Lucien Pissarro. Lucien Pissarro: His Watercolours : [exhibition] Wednesday 3rd to Friday 26th October 1990. Spink; 1990. p. 55.
 Marjorie Sherlock; Maltzahn Gallery. Marjorie Sherlock (1897-1973): Etchings--drawings--paintings: November–December 1973. Maltzahn Gallery; 1973.
 The review of English studies. 1929. p. 511.

External links
 

1897 births
1973 deaths
20th-century British printmakers
20th-century English painters
20th-century English women artists
Alumni of the Royal College of Art
Alumni of the Slade School of Fine Art
Alumni of the Westminster School of Art
British etchers
People from Wanstead
Women etchers